Budki Wierzchowskie  is a village in the administrative district of Gmina Jedlińsk, within Radom County, Masovian Voivodeship, in east-central Poland.

The village has a population of 50.

References

Budki Wierzchowskie